Wadim "Bill" Mishalow is a retired American soccer goalkeeper who played in the North American Soccer League and the Major Indoor Soccer League.

Mishalow attended the University of Alabama, Huntsville, playing on the men's soccer team from 1973 to 1975.  In 1976, he turned professional with the Los Angeles Aztecs of the North American Soccer League.  He spent three seasons in Los Angeles before moving to the Memphis Rogues for the start of the 1979 season.  He finished the season with the New England Tea Men.  In the fall of 1979, he signed with the Pittsburgh Spirit of the Major Indoor Soccer League but injuries prevented him from playing until the end of December.  He was back in the NASL in 1980 with the Atlanta Chiefs.  The Chiefs then sent him to the Chicago Sting where he played the 1980–1981 NASL indoor season.  In the fall of 1981, he was back in the MISL, this time with the Memphis Americans.  He played three seasons with the Americans.

References

External links
 NASL stats

1952 births
Living people
Soccer players from Chicago
American soccer players
Atlanta Chiefs players
Chicago Sting (NASL) players
Los Angeles Aztecs players
Major Indoor Soccer League (1978–1992) players
Memphis Americans players
Memphis Rogues players
North American Soccer League (1968–1984) indoor players
New England Tea Men players
North American Soccer League (1968–1984) players
Pittsburgh Spirit players
Association football goalkeepers